Mount Muir is a mountain located on the Continental Divide on the Alberta-British Columbia border. The mountain was named in 1918 after Alexander Muir. It is located in the High Rock Range.

See also
 List of peaks on the British Columbia–Alberta border

References

Two-thousanders of Alberta
Two-thousanders of British Columbia
Canadian Rockies